Khaybullinsky District (Xäybulla rayonı) an administrative and municipal district (raion), one of the fifty-four in the Republic of Bashkortostan, Russia. It is located in the south of the republic and borders with Zilairsky and Baymaksky Districts in the north, Orenburg Oblast in the east and south, and with Zianchurinsky District in the west. Its administrative center is the rural locality (a selo) of Akyar. As of the 2010 Census, the total population of the district was 33,398, with the population of Akyar accounting for 20.8% of that number.

Geography
The Tanalyk, Sakmara, and Bolshaya Urtazymka Rivers flow through the district's territory.

History
The district was established on August 20, 1930. It is named after its administrative center, which was previously known as Khaybullino.

Administrative and municipal status
Within the framework of administrative divisions, Khaybullinsky District is one of the fifty-four in the Republic of Bashkortostan. The district is divided into fourteen selsoviets, comprising fifty-seven rural localities. As a municipal division, the district is incorporated as Khaybullinsky Municipal District. Its fourteen selsoviets are incorporated as fourteen rural settlements within the municipal district. The selo of Akyar serves as the administrative center of both the administrative and municipal district.

Economy
The economy of the district is agricultural in nature, although there are also copper- and gold-mining operations.

Towns and settlements
Abdulnasyrovo

References

Notes

Sources

Districts of Bashkortostan
States and territories established in 1930